The 1901 Saint Louis Blue and White football team was an American football team that represented Saint Louis University during the 1901 college football season. In their third season under head coach Martin J. Delaney, the team compiled a 10–0 record and outscored opponents by a total of 233 to 14. The team played its home games at Handlan's Park in St. Louis.

Schedule

References

Saint Louis
Saint Louis Billikens football seasons
College football undefeated seasons
Saint Louis Blue and White football